Club Olympique de Saint-Dizier is a French football club based in Saint-Dizier, Haute-Marne. It was founded in 1933. The club was declared bankrupt in April 2013.

External links
 Official Forum

Association football clubs established in 1933
1933 establishments in France
Sport in Haute-Marne
Football clubs in Grand Est